Actopan Municipality is a municipality located in the montane central zone in the State of Veracruz, about 50 km from state capital Xalapa. It has a surface of 822.54 km2. Actopan, the municipal head-board is a small city, located closely of the capital of the state; for its nature, the extraordinary richness of its lands and the determination of its population  has placed to this region as one of the most important zones of production of Mango of the State.

Geography

Adjacent municipalities 
Alto Lucero de Gutiérrez Barrios Municipality (north)
Úrsulo Galván Municipality (southeast)
Puente Nacional Municipality (south)
Emiliano Zapata Municipality (southwest)
Naolinco Municipality (west)

Major highways 
 Mexican Federal Highway 180

Geographic limits 
The municipality of Actopan is delimited to the east by the Golfo de Mexico, to the south by the Emiliano Zapata, to the west by the Naolinco, and to the north by Alto Lucero. It is watered by the river Actopan, which it is born in Cofre de Perote, ends in the Gulf of Mexico, forming the Barra de Chachalacas.

Agriculture
It produces principally maize, beans chayote squash and the most important the mango production.

Celebrations
In  Actopan , in October takes place the celebration in honor to San Francisco de Asís, Patron of the town, and in December takes place the celebration in honor to Virgen de Guadalupe also a Mexican celebration called El dia de los muertos which means Day Of the dead.

Weather
The weather in  Actopan  is warm and wet all year with rains in summer and autumn.

References

External links 
  Municipal Official Site
  Municipal Official Information

Municipalities of Veracruz